Samuel Kotz (August 30, 1930 Harbin, China – March 16, 2010 Silver Spring, Maryland) was a professor and research scholar in the Department of Engineering Management and Systems Engineering, School of Engineering and Applied Science at The George Washington University since 1997 until his death on March 16, 2010. He was an author or editor of several standard reference works in statistics and probability theory.

Early life
Kotz was born in Harbin, China, to a Jewish family who has left Russia following the Russian Revolution. He moved to Israel in 1949, serving in the Israeli Air Force. Kotz immigrated to the United States in the 1950s and become an American citizen in the 1970s.

Education and career
Kotz studied electrical engineering at the Harbin Institute of Technology, graduating with honors in 1946. He obtained an M.A. with honors in mathematics in 1956 from the Hebrew University in Jerusalem. He obtained a PhD degree in Mathematical Statistics from Cornell University.

In 1964, Kotz joined the University of Toronto as associate professor. He then moved to Temple University, Philadelphia, as a professor of mathematics in 1967 and the University of Maryland, College Park, as a professor in the College of Business and Management in 1979. In 1997 he joined the Operations Research Department at George Washington University. His visiting positions included Bowling Green State University, Bucknell University, Harbin Institute of Technology, Luleå University of Technology, Tel Aviv University, and University of Guelph.

Honors and awards
Kotz was awarded honorary doctorates from Harbin Institute of Technology in 1982, University of Athens in 1995 and Bowling Green State University in 1997. He was a fellow of the American Statistical Association, fellow of the Institute of Mathematical Statistics, fellow of the Royal Statistical Society and elected member of the International Statistical Institute.
 Awarded by the Washington Academy of Sciences in 1998

Family
Kotz married Raysel Greenwald in 1962. They had their first child, Tamar Kotz, in 1965. Followed by Harold David Kotz in 1966 and Pnina Kotz in 1973. His first two children were born in Toronto, but moved to Philadelphia in 1967.

Publications
He and Norman L. Johnson founded the Encyclopedia of Statistical Sciences (1982–1999), of which he was editor-in-chief. He was also a co-author of the four-volume Compendium on Statistical Distributions (First Edition 1969–1972, Second Edition 1993–1997). Over the course of his career he authored or co-authored a total of three Russian-English scientific dictionaries, over three dozen volumes/books/monographs in the field of statistics and quality control and over 280 papers.

Books

See also
 Saralees Nadarajah (2004) A Conversation with Samuel Kotz, Statistical Science, 17, 2, 220–233. A conversation with Samuel Kotz

References

External links
 Samuel Kotz

1930 births
2010 deaths
20th-century American mathematicians
American people of Russian-Jewish descent
Chinese emigrants to the United States
Chinese expatriates in Israel
Chinese Jews
Chinese people of Russian-Jewish descent
Elected Members of the International Statistical Institute
Fellows of the American Statistical Association
Fellows of the Institute of Mathematical Statistics
Israeli Air Force personnel
Jews and Judaism in Harbin
People with acquired American citizenship
People from Harbin
University of Maryland, College Park faculty
Bowling Green State University faculty
Mathematical statisticians
Academic staff of the University of Toronto
Hebrew University of Jerusalem alumni
Cornell University alumni
George Washington University faculty
Temple University faculty